Fly West (1974) is an autobiography written for children by Australian author Ivan Southall.  It won the Children's Book of the Year Award: Older Readers in 1976.

Book outline
The book tells the story of Ivan Southall's time as a captain of a Sunderland flying boat during World War II.

Critical reception
A reviewer in The Sydney Morning Herald noted: "Fly West is not for those who like to find vicarious excitement in the reading of war books. Ivan Southall gives the truth of the times, and melancholy tinges his account as he writes of men who died, of men who survived to find that evil has triumphed more often than right."

See also
 1974 in Australian literature

Notes
 Dedication: To Barbara Ker Wilson.

References

Australian autobiographies
1974 children's books
Children's non-fiction books
World War II memoirs
Aviation books
CBCA Children's Book of the Year Award-winning works
Australian children's books
Angus & Robertson books